The 1952 Five Nations Championship was the twenty-third series of the rugby union Five Nations Championship. Including the previous incarnations as the Home Nations and Five Nations, this was the fifty-eighth series of the northern hemisphere rugby union championship. Ten matches were played between 12 January and 5 April. It was contested by England, France, Ireland, Scotland and Wales. Wales won their 5th title and a 9th Triple Crown.

Participants
The teams involved were:

Table

Results

Source:

References

Six Nations Championship seasons
Five Nations
Five Nations 
Five Nations
Five Nations
Five Nations
Five Nations
Five Nations
Five Nations
Five Nations
Five Nations